Sunduz "Susie" Ramadan (born 10 April 1979) is an Australian professional boxer. She held the IBF female bantamweight title in 2011 and the WBC female bantamweight title from 2012 to 2014.

Biography
Ramadan was raised in the Western suburbs of Melbourne with her sister, Julia. She is Muslim and comes from an Albanian and Turkish background.

Professional boxing record

References

External links 

1979 births
Living people
Australian Muslims
Australian people of Albanian descent
Australian people of Turkish descent
Australian women boxers
World Boxing Council champions
International Boxing Federation champions
World bantamweight boxing champions
Bantamweight boxers